"Sad se jasno vidi" is a song by the Yugoslav new wave band Šarlo Akrobata, from the album Bistriji ili tuplji čovek biva kad..., released in 1981.

Cover versions 
 Serbian rock band Plejboj recorded a cover version of the song for the various artists compilation Korak napred 2 koraka nazad in 1999. It was the last recording the band had made.

External links and references 

 EX YU ROCK enciklopedija 1960-2006, Janjatović Petar; 

1981 songs